Daniela Kosán Montcourt (born 24 February 1974 in Maracay) is a Venezuelan model and television presenter.

She was a contestant in the Miss Venezuela pageant in 1997 and a major favorite for the crown behind Cristina Dieckmann; Kosan placed third in the final contest after Dieckmann and Veruska Ramirez, the eventual winner. Thereafter she represented Venezuela in the Nuestra Belleza Internacional pageant where she finished as the winner. After that, she represented her country in Miss International 1998, narrowly missing the crown; her second-place finish was attributed to the reigning Miss International, Consuelo Adler, being a fellow Venezuelan. The next year, she was the weather girl in Venevisión news shows. In 2000, she worked as hostess for E! Latin America on Televen. She hosted the Venezuelan adaptation of American game show Pyramid called Contra reloj from 2001 to 2002.

Kosán was also known for being one of the Chicas Polar for an advertising campaign for a brewery.

External links
FanSite de la bella Daniela Kosan
Profile in Televen (Google cache)
E! Online Latino
Biography
About Chicas Polar 2003

People from Maracay
Miss Venezuela International winners
Venezuelan female models
1974 births
Living people
Venezuelan television presenters
Miss International 1998 delegates
Venezuelan women television presenters